Julia Frifield (born 1962) is an American government official who previously served as Assistant Secretary of State for Legislative Affairs from October 21, 2013, to January 20, 2017.

Prior to serving as Assistant Secretary of State, she was Chief of Staff for longtime U.S. Senator Barbara Mikulski.

References 

1962 births
Living people
Smith College alumni
Alumni of the University of Cambridge
United States Assistant Secretaries of State
Place of birth missing (living people)
Date of birth missing (living people)